The third cabinet of Hjalmar Branting was the cabinet of Sweden between 14 October 1924 and 24 February 1925.

When the cabinet of Trygger resigned on 14 October 1924, Hjalmar Branting took office as prime minister for the third time. Due to health reasons, the government was changed on 24 February 1925 to the cabinet of Rickard Sandler.

Background
After an even election result in the general election, 1921 the Swedish Social Democratic Party got 104 seats in the Riksdag, but the Right party and the Farmers' League did also increased theirs. Both sides took votes from the liberals. King Gustaf V had tried to ask Carl Gustaf Ekman to form a government based on the Right party, but without success. He then turned to Hjalmar Branting, whom declared that he would form a social democratic government, not a coalition government. After many discussions, the party formed a cabinet, with newer and younger names as ministers, excluding older and more known names.

The government decreased the fundings of the defence forces. When Branting got ill in November 1924, it was clear that he would not recover. Fredrik Vilhelm Thorsson were the self-evident successor, but he also got sick. On 19 January 1925, Branting declared his resignation as prime minister. After many discussions in the cabinet, he was succeeded by Rickard Sandler on 22 January.

Ministers and Ministries

References

External links
The Government and the Government Offices of Sweden

Cabinets of Sweden
1924 establishments in Sweden
1925 disestablishments in Sweden
Cabinets established in 1924
Cabinets disestablished in 1925